Marcos Nicolás Senesi Barón (born 10 May 1997) is an Argentine professional footballer who plays as a centre-back for  club AFC Bournemouth and the Argentina national team.

Club career

San Lorenzo
Senesi made his debut for San Lorenzo on 25 September 2016 as a starter in the Argentine Primera División match against Club Atlético Patronato. On 16 September 2017, he scored his first and only goal for the club in a 1–0 win against Arsenal de Sarandí.

Feyenoord

On 2 September 2019, Senesi signed a four-year contract with Dutch football club Feyenoord. On 10 November 2019, he scored his first goal for the club, the winning goal in a 3–2 win against RKC Waalwijk, heading in a free kick in the 85th minute.

Bournemouth 
On 8 August 2022, Senesi transferred to Premier League club AFC Bournemouth on a four-year contract for an undisclosed fee.

International career
Born in Argentina, Senesi is of Italian descent. He was called up to both the Italy and the Argentina national teams, who were both due to face each other for the 2022 Finalissima June 2022. He chose to represent the Argentina national team, and made his debut on 5 June 2022 in a friendly match against the Estonia national team.

Career statistics

Club

International

Honours
Feyenoord
 UEFA Europa Conference League runner-up: 2021–22

Argentina

 CONMEBOL–UEFA Cup of Champions: 2022

Individual
 Eredivisie Goal of the Year: 2020–21

References

External links
Profile at the AFC Bournemouth website
 Career stats - Voetbal International

1997 births
Living people
People from Concordia, Entre Ríos
Sportspeople from Entre Ríos Province
Argentine footballers
Association football defenders
San Lorenzo de Almagro footballers
Feyenoord players
AFC Bournemouth players
Argentine Primera División players
Eredivisie players
Premier League players
Argentina youth international footballers
Argentina international footballers
Argentine expatriate footballers
Expatriate footballers in England
Expatriate footballers in the Netherlands
Argentine expatriate sportspeople in England
Argentine expatriate sportspeople in the Netherlands
Argentine people of Italian descent